Bol or Bal or Bel in Iran may refer to:
 Bol, Mazandaran, Iran
 Bol, Chabahar, Chabahar County, Sistan and Baluchestan Province, Iran
 Bal, Qasr-e Qand, Qasr-e Qand County, Sistan and Baluchestan Province, Iran
 Bal-e Bala, Qasr-e Qand County, Sistan and Baluchestan Province, Iran
 Bal-e Pain, Qasr-e Qand County, Sistan and Baluchestan Province, Iran
 Bal, Zanjan, Iran